In mathematics, the axis–angle representation of a rotation parameterizes a rotation in a three-dimensional Euclidean space by two quantities:  a unit vector   indicating the direction of an axis of rotation, and an angle  describing the magnitude of the rotation about the axis. For example, the elevation and azimuth angles of  suffice to locate it in any particular Cartesian coordinate frame.

By Rodrigues' rotation formula, the angle and axis determine a transformation that rotates three-dimensional vectors. The rotation occurs in the sense prescribed by the right-hand rule. The rotation axis is sometimes called the Euler axis.

It is one of many rotation formalisms in three dimensions. The axis–angle representation is predicated on Euler's rotation theorem, which dictates that any rotation or sequence of rotations of a rigid body in a three-dimensional space is equivalent to a pure rotation about a single fixed axis.

Rotation vector

The axis–angle representation is equivalent to the more concise rotation vector, also called the Euler vector. In this case, both the rotation axis and the angle are represented by a vector codirectional with the rotation axis whose length is the rotation angle ,

It is used for the exponential and logarithm maps involving this representation.

Many rotation vectors correspond to the same rotation. In particular, a rotation vector of length , for any integer , encodes exactly the same rotation as a rotation vector of length . Thus, there are at least a countable infinity of rotation vectors corresponding to any rotation. These facts must be taken into account when inverting the exponential map, that is, when finding a rotation vector that corresponds to a given rotation matrix. The exponential map is onto but not one-to-one.

Example
Say you are standing on the ground and you pick the direction of gravity to be the negative  direction. Then if you turn to your left, you will rotate  radians (or -90°) about the  axis. Viewing the axis-angle representation as an ordered pair, this would be

The above example can be represented as a rotation vector with a magnitude of  pointing in the  direction,

Uses 
The axis–angle representation is convenient when dealing with rigid body dynamics.  It is useful to both characterize rotations, and also for converting between different representations of rigid body motion, such as homogeneous transformations and twists.

When a rigid body rotates around a fixed axis, its axis–angle data are a constant rotation axis and the rotation angle continuously dependent on time.

Rotating a vector 

Rodrigues' rotation formula, named after Olinde Rodrigues, is an efficient algorithm for rotating a Euclidean vector, given a rotation axis and an angle of rotation.

For the rotation of a single vector it may be more efficient than converting  and  into a rotation matrix to rotate the vector.

Relationship to other representations 

There are several ways to represent a rotation. It is useful to understand how different representations relate to one another, and how to convert between them.

Exponential map from 𝔰𝔬(3) to SO(3) 

The exponential map effects a transformation from the axis-angle representation of rotations to rotation matrices,

Essentially, by using a Taylor expansion one derives a closed-form relation  between these two representations.

Since, by the Cayley–Hamilton theorem,  = 0, this implies that 
  
As a result, . 

Thus, from the above equation, it follows that

that is,

by the Taylor series formula for trigonometric functions.

This is a Lie-algebraic derivation, in contrast to the geometric one in the article Rodrigues' rotation formula.

Due to the existence of the above-mentioned exponential map, the unit vector  representing the rotation axis, and the angle  are sometimes called the exponential coordinates of the rotation matrix .

Log map from SO(3) to 𝔰𝔬(3) 

Let  continue to denote the 3 × 3 matrix that effects the cross product with the rotation axis :  for all vectors  in what follows. 

To retrieve the axis–angle representation of a rotation matrix, calculate the angle of rotation from the trace of the rotation matrix

and then use that to find the normalized axis,

where  is the component of the rotation matrix, in the -th row and -th column.

The above calculation of axis vector  does not work if  is symmetric.

The matrix logarithm of the rotation matrix  is

In this case, the log is not unique. However, even in the case where  the Frobenius norm of the log is

is the geodesic distance on the 3D manifold of rotation matrices.

In that case, the off-axis terms will actually provide better information about  since, for small angles, .

In that case, we must reconsider the above formula.

At , we have

and so let

Unit quaternions 

the following expression transforms axis–angle coordinates to versors (unit quaternions):

Given a versor  represented with its scalar  and vector , the axis–angle coordinates can be extracted using the following:

A more numerically stable expression of the rotation angle uses the atan2 function:

where  is the Euclidean norm of the 3-vector .

See also 

 Homogeneous coordinates 
 Screw theory, a representation of rigid body motions and velocities using the concepts of twists, screws and wrenches
 Pseudovector
 Rotations without a matrix

References 

Rotation in three dimensions
Angle